Brachyiulus is a genus of millipedes, containing around eight species, most of which live in the Mediterranean Basin of Europe and Asia. The species B. pusillus has been introduced widely around the world

Species
Brachyiulus apfelbecki Verhoeff 1898
Brachyiulus bagnalli (Brolemann 1924)
Brachyiulus jawlowskii  Lohmander 1928
Brachyiulus klisurensis  Verhoeff 1903
Brachyiulus lusitanus  Verhoeff 1898
Brachyiulus pusillus  (Leach 1814)
Brachyiulus stuxbergi  (Fanzago 1875)
Brachyiulus varibolinus  Attems 1904

References

Julida
Millipedes of Europe
Millipedes of Asia